D_Cide Traumerei (stylized as D_CIDE TRAUMEREI) is a Japanese mixed-media project produced by Bushiroad, Sumzap and Drecom. It is a mobile game that was released on September 30, 2021 and ended on October 28, 2022, and an anime television series by Sanzigen which aired from July to October 2021.

Summary 
D_Cide Traumerei takes place in a world populated by ancient eldritch-style entities. The entities can "bleed" into reality, altering it and granting power to people who seek a pact with them. Slayers known as "Knocker Ups" have been tasked to defeat these creatures.

Plot

Video Game 
Teenager Rando Furukata is pulled into another side of reality and gets involved in a horrific and unnatural murder. He and his friends are chosen to be "Knocker Up" after they encounter a monster. Rando and his friends must investigate the strange incident with their teacher and defend the island from the monster in a dream world.

Anime 
Ryuuhei Oda and Rena Mouri accidentally enter the other side of reality and encounter a grotesque creature. They are rescued by Trish, a creature with knowledge of the other side of reality. Trish grants Ryuuhei and Rena power and they are chosen as Knocker Ups to combat the creatures. Ryuuhei and Rena are joined by more experienced slayers, Aruto Fushibe and Jessica Clayborn, as they fight the creatures and learn more about the other side.

Characters

Production and release
The project was announced on March 16, 2021, with a mobile game released on September 30, 2021, as well as an anime television series, which aired from July 10 to October 2, 2021, on Tokyo MX and other channels. Yoshikazu Kon is directing the series at Sanzigen, with Hiroshi Ōnogi writing the script, BlasTrain designing the characters, and Kōhei Tanaka composing the music. The opening song, is performed by Tokyo Jihen. 4-member unit Rondo from D4DJ performs the ending theme titled "Black Lotus." Plus Media Networks Asia has licensed the series in Southeast Asia and released it on Aniplus Asia. Crunchyroll licensed the series outside of Asia.

Episode list

Notes

References

External links
Game official website 
Anime official website 

2021 video games
Android (operating system) games
Bushiroad
Crunchyroll anime
IOS games
Japan-exclusive video games
Japanese role-playing video games
Mobile games
Sanzigen
Tokyo MX original programming
Video games developed in Japan
Inactive online games